The Diocese of Port Harcourt is a Latin Church ecclesiastical territory or diocese of the Catholic Church in Nigeria. The episcopal see is Port Harcourt, Rivers State. The Diocese of Port Harcourt is in the ecclesiastical province of metropolitan Archdiocese of Calabar.

History
 May 16, 1961: Established as Diocese of Port Harcourt from the Diocese of Owerri

Special churches
The diocesan cathedral is Corpus Christi Cathedral located in D-line, Port Harcourt.

Bishops
 Bishops of Port Harcourt
 Bishop Godfrey Okoye, C.S.Sp. (1961.05.16 – 1970.03.07), appointed Bishop of Enugu
 Bishop Alexius Obabu Makozi (1991.08.31 - 2009.05.04)
 Bishop Camillus Archibong Etokudoh  (since 2009.05.04)

Auxiliary Bishop
Patrick S. Eluke (2019-)

See also
Roman Catholicism in Nigeria
List of Roman Catholic churches in Port Harcourt

Sources
 GCatholic.org Information
 Catholic Hierarchy

 
Port Hartcourt
Christian organizations established in 1961
Roman Catholic dioceses and prelatures established in the 20th century
1961 establishments in Nigeria
Roman Catholic Ecclesiastical Province of Calabar